The 1996–97 Munster Rugby season was Munster's second season as a professional team, during which they competed in the IRFU Interprovincial Championship and Heineken Cup.

1996–97 squad

1996–97 IRFU Interprovincial Championship

1996–97 Heineken Cup

Pool 4

Friendlies

References

External links
1996–97 Munster Rugby season official site 
1996–97 Munster Rugby Heineken Cup

1996–97
1996–97 in Irish rugby union